First instituted in 1901, the Nobel Prize has been awarded to a total of 904 individuals (852 men and 52 women) and 24 organizations . Among the recipients, 11 are Indians (four Indian citizens and seven of Indian ancestry or residency). Rabindranath Tagore was the first Indian citizen to be awarded and also first Asian to be awarded in 1913. Mother Teresa is the only woman among the list of recipients. Sri Aurobindo, the Indian poet, philosopher, nationalist and developer of Integral yoga, was nominated unsuccessfully for the Nobel Prize in Literature in 1943 and for the Nobel Peace Prize in 1950.

On 1 December 1999, the Norwegian Nobel Committee confirmed that Mahatma Gandhi was nominated unsuccessfully for the Peace Prize five times (from 1937 to 1939, in 1947 and a few days before he was assassinated in January 1948). In 2006, Geir Lundestad, the Secretary of Norwegian Nobel Committee, cited it as "the greatest omission in our 106-year history".

Laureates
Two of the Nobel laureates (Tagore and Raman) were citizens of British India at the time they were awarded while two also were of foreign origin (Ross and Kipling). Three of the laureates were citizens of the Republic of India (Mother Teresa, Sen, and Satyarthi) and four were Indian by birth (Khorana, Chandrasekhar, Ramakrishnan, and Banerjee) but subsequently non-citizens of India.

Nominees

See also 
 V. S. Naipaul, Trinidad and Tobago-born British Nobel laureate of Indian origin
 List of Indians
 List of Nobel laureates
 List of Nobel laureates by country
 List of Asian Nobel laureates

Notes

References 

Nobel laureates
 
Lists of Nobel laureates by nationality